Salmon Creek is a  tributary of Lake River in Clark County in the U.S. state of Washington. Beginning from its forested headwaters on Elkhorn Mountain, Salmon Creek passes through rural, agricultural, residential, and urban areas before flowing into the river just north of Vancouver Lake. Lake River is a tributary of the Columbia River.

Major tributaries to Salmon Creek are Mill, Woodin, Rock, Morgan, and Curtin creeks. Several smaller streams, including Curtis Creek also flow into Salmon Creek.

Names
Salmon Creek is named for the salmon runs noted along the stream by early pioneers who settled in the area. The unincorporated community of Salmon Creek is named for the stream. The Salmon Creek Wastewater Treatment Plant is along the banks of lower Salmon Creek.

Watershed
Salmon Creek drains  of land that is least developed near the headwaters and increasingly developed further downstream. About 29 percent of the watershed is forested; 38 percent is devoted to fields, pastures, bare earth, and shrubland, and 33 percent has been developed for urban use.

The water quality of surface streams in the basin range from "good" in the forested areas to "very poor" in developed areas downstream. Harmful bacteria levels and high turbidity are the two most serious problems.

Bridge replacement
Klineline Bridge carrying Highway 99 over Salmon Creek was first built in 1927 and open to traffic in 1928, after replaced from the old Klineline Bridge (also known as "Marble bridge") was located few feet east of the current bridge (Klineline Bridge). After the creek eroded the bridge supports and part of the bridge collapsed in 1956, rebuilt it in 1956 or 1957, it closed on December 2, 2007 while a new bridge was built. Ostrander Rock and Construction of Longview won the construction contract with a bid that included completing the bridge within 160 days from start to finish. Work started on April 19, 2008 and completed on September 19, 2008, a week earlier than the contract deadline. The new span has four travel lanes, a center median divider island, bicycle lanes, curb/gutter, sidewalks and two pedestrian overlooks with views of Salmon Creek.

Recreation
Salmon Creek Park at the pond offers picnicking, fishing, swimming, and hiking opportunities. Connecting trails include Cougar Creek Trail and a trail between Klineline Pond and East Lake, east of Interstate 5.

Battle Ground Lake State Park, is a  camping park in the forest near the city of Battle Ground, east of Vancouver. Amenities at the park include picnic sites, trails, cabins, as well as fishing and a boat launch on  Battle Ground Lake.

See also
List of rivers of Washington
List of tributaries of the Columbia River

References

Rivers of Washington (state)
Rivers of Clark County, Washington